Gareth Humphreys (born 1935) is a former Welsh international lawn bowler. Gareth received an MBE in the 2009 Birthday Honours for his voluntary services to lawn bowls.

Bowls career
He won a bronze medal in the triples at the 1972 World Outdoor Bowls Championship in Worthing.

In addition he won 15 national titles and 16 county titles and was capped 90 times by Wales from 1963 until 1978.

He played for Barry Athletic Bowls Club from 1959 and represented Wales at the Lawn bowls at the 1974 British Commonwealth Games in New Zealand.

He is a four times Welsh National Champion, winning the triples in 1974 and the fours in 1963, 1969 and 1976, when bowling for the Barry Athletic Bowls Club. He was the British Isles Bowls Championships fours winner in 1964.

Personal life
He was a third generation bowler following his grandfather and father (who was a Welsh international 1957-58) who introduced him into bowls during June 1945.

References

1935 births
Living people
Welsh male bowls players
Bowls players at the 1974 British Commonwealth Games
Commonwealth Games competitors for Wales